Serbian Social Democratic Party may refer to:

 Serbian Social Democratic Party (Kosovo)
 Serbian Social Democratic Party (Kingdom of Serbia) (1903-1918)